Fictional colleges are perennially popular in modern novels, allowing the author much greater licence when describing the more intimate activities of a Cambridge college and a way of placing events that might not be permitted by actual Cambridge geography.

Below is a list of some of the fictional colleges of the University of Cambridge.

All Saints College, The Man in Room 17, The Green Man by Kingsley Amis, mentioned briefly in Dirk Gently's Holistic Detective Agency by Douglas Adams and in Dreaming of the Bones by Deborah Crombie.
Boniface College, Cambridge,  Pendennis by William Thackeray, inspired by his time at Cambridge and home to the poet Sprott.
Brakespeare College, Manalive by G. K. Chesterton
Canterbury College, The Mezzotint by M. R. James
Fawkes College, in the novels of Mary Selby/Joanna Bell/Mary Lowth. The College features her book Gargoyles and Port, in which it is rival to the neighbouring St Alupent's College
Fisher College, The Cambridge Murders by Dilwyn Rees, situated between real-life St John's College and Trinity College
Flopsy College, In the episode Return of the Mummy of children's spy series M.I. High
Haworth College, Dr Rose Fenemore in Stormy Petrel by Mary Stewart is described as the College's English tutor, though most of the novel is set on the Isle of Mull 
Hawkins College, The longstanding rivals of Old College in the series of PorterGirl books and blog of the same name written by Lucy Brazier  
Humber College, Hugo Lamb, narrator of the second chapter in David Mitchell's novel The Bone Clocks, is an undergraduate at Humber, a medieval college in the city centre 
Lancaster College, various books by Simon Raven.  Bears more than a passing resemblance to King's College, founded by Henry VI of the House of Lancaster
Lauds College, various books by Susan Howatch.  Fictionally contains Cambridge Cathedral, so is similar to Christ Church, Oxford. Charles Ashworth was a fellow of the College and many other characters studied there. Named after William Laud, controversial 17th century Archbishop of Canterbury
Marcian College, Raisley Conyngham's old college in In the Image of God by Simon Raven. Located between the Round Church and Portugal Place, i.e. between St John's and Jesus. Described by its head porter as "the least distinguished college in the kingdom, with the possible exception of Hertford College, Oxford"
Old College, fictional college from the PorterGirl books and blog, written by Lucy Brazier
Pelby College, spoof college that Cambridge students use as an "unmistakable landmark" when giving directions to tourists. By convention it is located somewhere between Magdalene and St John's.
Porterhouse College, Porterhouse Blue and Grantchester Grind by Tom Sharpe.  The name suggests Peterhouse, though it is also a pun on college porters and porterhouse steaks. It is also reputedly based loosely on Pembroke, Sharpe's alma mater or Corpus Christi which is next door and its location is somewhere near Peterhouse and Pembroke. Despite this, however, filming for the television series took place at Sidney Sussex College. A Porterhouse College in the (fictional) University of Carrbridge, Inverness-shire has been used in University of Cambridge mathematics exam questions.
Rachel Ambrose College, Christminster, Culture Shock (Duckworth 1988)  by Valerie Grosvenor Myer, a graduate of Newnham, and sometime Associate of Lucy Cavendish, which, as a college for mature women students, it most resembles
St Agatha's College, The Wyndham Case (1993),  A Piece of Justice (1995), Debts of Dishonour (2006) and The Bad Quarto (2007)  by Jill Paton Walsh, located between Castle Mound and Chesterton Lane
St Alupent's College, in the novels of Mary Selby/Joanna Bell/Mary Lowth. The College is the setting of her book Gargoyles and Port. The author studied at Gonville and Caius College. She named St Alupent's after a branded asthma syrup available on the NHS at the time
St Angelicus College, The Gate of Angels (1990) by Penelope Fitzgerald. Situated not far from Christ's Pieces.
St Barnabas' College, Tomorrow's Ghost (1979) by Anthony Price
St Bartholemew's College, Nights in White Satin (1999) by Michelle Spring. Located near the police station and New Square, with murders investigated by Laura Principal of Newnham College
St Bernard's College, Darkness at Pemberley by T. H. White.  Loosely disguised version of Queens' College
St Botolph's College, example college in Cambridge University Computing Service documentation.
St Bride's College, the setting for much of Charlie Cochrane's Cambridge Fellows Mysteries
St Cedd's College, various works by Douglas Adams.  Based on St. John's College, the alma mater of Douglas Adams
St Dunstan's College, Cambridge, College of Professor Austin Herring, who appears in Chris Addison's The Ape That Got Lucky and Civilisation
St Ignatius' College, the university that Albert Campion went to, according to the novels of Margery Allingham; see his minibiography in Sweet Danger. 
St Margaret's College, The Cambridge Theorem by Tony Cape
St Mark's College, Tom Browning's Schooldays by Joel Vincent
St Martha's College, Matricide at St. Martha's by Ruth Dudley Edwards
St Martin's College, War Game by Anthony Price
St Mary's College, The Hills of Varna by Geoffrey Trease
St Matthew's College, The Green Man by Kingsley Amis, next door to St Catharine's College. Also in various works by Stephen Fry - in which it is a loosely disguised version of Queens' College, revealed by names of bridges and courts
St Paul's College, located on St Andrew's Street, between Christ's and Emmanuel, in The Pink and the Grey by Anthony Camber
St Radegund's College, an all-female college in Hearts and Mind by Rosy Thornton
St Stephen's College, For the Sake of Elena by Elizabeth George, located between Trinity College and Trinity Hall, modelled on the latter. In the BBC adaptation of the Inspector Lynley Mysteries, St John's College was used as the setting
St Swithin's College, In James Hilton's Random Harvest, the college attended by Charles Ranier, the main character, and a decade later by Harrison, the narrator. Founded in the latter 16th century
Saviours’ College, In Sophie Hannah's The Monogram Murders, the college attended by Patrick Ive
Tudor College, the home of the main characters in The Night Climbers by Ivo Stourton
Weirdsister College, Magical college, setting of a sequel to The Worst Witch
Wetmarsh College, subject of an operetta by Mark Wainwright and Roland Anderson entitled Wetmarsh College, or, Dr Middlebottom, first staged at the ADC Theatre, Cambridge, in 2005 (Wetmarsh is never explicitly said to be in Cambridge, but Wainwright's libretto [albeit including a little Oxford terminology] and the place of its composition and first performance make it fairly clear)
 An unnamed college in C. P. Snow's novel The Masters and other novels in the Strangers and Brothers series. Snow disparaged what he called the 'Christminster' convention of the naming of fictitious colleges
 An unnamed college in the BBC Radio 4 comedy series High Table, Lower Orders

See also
Colleges of the University of Cambridge
List of fictional Oxford colleges
List of fictional Oxbridge colleges
School and university in literature

References

Cambridge
Cambridge colleges
Fictional colleges
Cambridge